The 1976 Wisconsin Badgers football team was an American football team that represented the University of Wisconsin–Madison in the 1976 Big Ten Conference football season. In their seventh season under head coach John Jardine, the Badgers compiled a 5–6 record (3–5 against Big Ten opponents) and finished in a three-way tie for seventh place in the Big Ten.

Quarterback Mike Carroll was selected as the team's most valuable player and led the Big Ten Conference with 1,773 yards of total offense. Running back Larry Canada led the team with 993 rushing yards, the fifth-highest total in the Big Ten during the 1976 season. Ira Matthews was the team's leading scorer with 42 points on seven touchdowns.

David Charles was selected by the AP as a second-team wide receiver, and Dave Crossen by the UPI as a second-team linebacker, on the 1976 All-Big Ten Conference football team.

Schedule

Roster

Players selected in the 1977 NFL Draft
Only one Wisconsin player was selected in the 1977 NFL Draft.

References

Wisconsin
Wisconsin Badgers football seasons
Wisconsin Badgers football